NBL1 Central, formerly the Premier League, is a semi-professional basketball league in South Australia, comprising both a men's and women's competition. In 2020, Basketball South Australia partnered with the National Basketball League (NBL) to bring NBL1 to South Australia. NBL1 replaced the former Premier League to create more professional pathways and opportunities for males and females playing basketball in South Australia. As a result, the Premier League became the central conference of NBL1.

History
The South Australian Metropolitan Basketball Association was founded in 1936. All games were played at Duncan Buildings, Franklin Street, Adelaide, with 16 teams competing. After World War II, basketball resumed at the Our Boys Institute in the city and at suburban drill halls, with 27 teams. In 1951, the District Association was formed, and by 1954, there were 57 teams competing in all grades. The first official State League season (according to Basketball South Australia records) was in 1957.

In 1998, the SA State League joined the Continental Basketball Association (CBA) as the association's Central Conference, with the CBA being rebranded as the Australian Basketball Association (ABA) the following year. The Central Australian Basketball League name was coined in 2002 and remained until 2014. The league was rebranded in 2015 and renamed Premier League.

In February 2020, Basketball South Australia and the National Basketball League (NBL) announced a new partnership to bring NBL1 to South Australia, with the Premier League being renamed NBL1 Central and becoming the central conference of NBL1. However, due to the coronavirus pandemic, the 2020 season was cancelled.

Current clubs 

* Teams that transferred from the Premier League.

List of champions

References

External links

 2015 Premier League
 2015 Premier League Media Guide

 
NBL1
Premier League (Australia)
1
2
1936 establishments in Australia
Sports leagues established in 1936